Cardiff Amateur Athletic Club (Cardiff AAC), formed in 1882 as Roath (Cardiff) Harriers, is an athletics club based at the Cardiff International Sports Stadium, Cardiff. The club began as a cross country club, the first athletics only club in Wales. Roath Harriers runners became individual and team champions of the first Welsh Cross Country Championships, held on 7 March 1894. Roath Harriers shared Maindy Stadium with Birchgrove Harriers from its opening in 1951 and the two clubs amalgamated to form Cardiff Amateur Athletic Club in 1968. Cardiff were British Athletics League champions in 1973, 1974, and 1975 and remain one of the top twelve clubs in Britain.

The club comprises five sections, each specialising in a separate sport: track and field, road running, cross country, mountain running, and road walking.

Cardiff AAC athletes have won a total of 122 medals at major international championships—Olympic and Paralympic Games, World and European Championships, Commonwealth Games and the World University Games.

Former and current Cardiff AAC athletes include: 
Jim Alford (1938 British Empire Games gold medalist) 
Lynn Davies (Lynn the Leap) (1964 Olympic Games gold medalist, 1966 and 1970 Commonwealth Games gold medalist) 
Clive Longe (1966 Commonwealth Games silver medalist) 
Berwyn Price (1974 silver and 1978 Commonwealth Games gold medalist) 
Steve Barry (1982 Commonwealth Games gold medalist) 
Colin Jackson (1993 and 1999 World Championships gold medalist and 1988 Olympic Games silver medalist) 
Venissa Head (1986 Commonwealth Games silver medalist) 
Angela Tooby (1986 Commonwealth Games bronze medalist)
Helen Miles (1986 Commonwealth Games bronze medalist) 
Carmen Smart (1986 Commonwealth Games bronze medalist) 
Kay Morley (1990 Commonwealth Games gold medalist) 
Tanni Grey-Thompson (winner of 11 Paralympic Games gold medals)
Tracey Hinton (double 1992 and 2000 Olympic Games silver medalist and 1992 Olympic Games bronze medalist)
Paul Gray (1994 and 1998 Commonwealth Games bronze medalist)
Douglas Turner (1998 Commonwealth Games bronze medalist)
Nigel Walker (1987 IAAF World Indoor Championships bronze medalist)
Jamie Baulch (1997 World Championships gold medalist, 1996 Olympic Games and 2002 Commonwealth Games silver medalist and 1998 Commonwealth Games bronze medalist)
Christian Malcolm (1998 Commonwealth Games silver medalist)
Rhys Williams (2012 European Championships Gold medalist)
Stephen Herbert (2000 Olympic Games silver medalist)
Matthew Elias (1998 Commonwealth Games bronze medalist and 2002 Commonwealth Games silver medalist)
Gable Garenamotse (2002 and 2006 Commonwealth Games silver medalist)
Tim Benjamin (2002 Commonwealth Games silver medalist)
David Omoregie (2014 World Junior Championships bronze medalist)

See also 
Sport in Cardiff

References

External links 
 Official website

Athletics clubs in Wales
Sports clubs established in 1882
Sport in Cardiff
1882 establishments in Wales
Amateur sport in the United Kingdom